Mingo y Aníbal, dos pelotazos en contra is a 1984 Argentine film.

Cast
 Juan Carlos Altavista as Mingo
 Juan Carlos Calabró as Aníbal
 Susana Traverso as María Miranda

External links

1984 films
Argentine adventure comedy films
1980s Spanish-language films
Films directed by Enrique Cahen Salaberry
1980s Argentine films